SS Richard Montgomery was an American Liberty cargo ship built during World War II. She was named after Richard Montgomery, an Irish officer who fought in the American Revolutionary War.

The ship was wrecked on the Nore sandbank in the Thames Estuary, near Sheerness, Kent, England, in August 1944, while carrying a cargo of munitions. About  of explosives remaining on board presents a hazard but the likelihood of explosion is claimed to be remote.

Construction
Richard Montgomery was laid down on 15 March 1943 under a Maritime Commission (MARCOM) contract, MC hull 1199, by the St. Johns River Shipbuilding Company, Jacksonville, Florida. She was sponsored by Mrs. Rockwell, the wife of the director of MARCOM, Production Division, and was launched on 15 June 1943. She was the seventh of the 82 liberty ships built by the yard.

Service history
She was allocated to Agwilines Inc. on 29 July 1943. In August 1944, on what was to be her final voyage, the ship left Hog Island, Philadelphia, where she had been loaded with 6,127 tons of munitions.

She travelled from the Delaware River to the Thames Estuary, then anchored while awaiting the formation of a convoy to travel to Cherbourg, France, which had come under Allied control on 27 July 1944, during the Battle of Normandy.

When Richard Montgomery arrived off Southend, she came under the authority of the Thames naval control at  located at the end of Southend Pier. The harbourmaster, responsible for all shipping movements in the estuary, ordered the ship to a berth off the north edge of Sheerness middle sands, an area designated as the Great Nore Anchorage.

A Rochester-based stevedore company was given the job of removing the cargo, which began on 23 August 1944, using the ship's own cargo handling equipment. By the next day, the ship's hull had cracked open, causing several cargo holds at the bow end to flood. The salvage operation continued until 25 September, when the ship was finally abandoned before all the cargo had been recovered. Subsequently, the vessel broke into two separate parts, roughly amidships.

During the enquiry following the shipwreck it was revealed that several ships moored nearby had noticed Richard Montgomery drifting towards the sandbank. They had attempted to signal an alert by sounding their sirens, but without avail because Captain Wilkie of Richard Montgomery was asleep. The ship's chief officer was unable to explain why he had not alerted the captain. A board of inquiry concluded that the anchorage the harbour master assigned had placed the ship in jeopardy, and returned the captain of Richard Montgomery to full duty within a week.

Status and risk

At all states of the tide, her three masts are visible above the water.

Because of the presence of the large quantity of unexploded ordnance, the ship is monitored by the Maritime and Coastguard Agency and is clearly marked on the relevant Admiralty charts. In 1973, she became the first wreck designated as dangerous under section 2 of the Protection of Wrecks Act 1973. There is an exclusion zone around her monitored visually and by radar. The exclusion zone around the wreck is defined by the following co-ordinates:

 
 
 
 

This comprises the following items of ordnance:
 4,439 ×  bombs of various types
 1,925 ×  bombs
 2,815 fragmentation bombs and bomb clusters
 Various explosive booster charges
 Various smoke bombs, including white phosphorus bombs
 Various pyrotechnic signals

An investigation by New Scientist magazine in 2004, based partly on government documents released in 2004, concluded that the cargo was still deadly, and could be detonated by a collision, an attack, or even shifting of the cargo in the tide. The deterioration of the bombs is so severe that they could explode spontaneously. Documents declassified shortly before revealed that the wreck was not dealt with immediately after it happened, or in the intervening 60 years, due to the expense.

The Maritime and Coastguard Agency nevertheless believes that the risk of a major explosion is remote. The UK government's Receiver of Wreck commissioned a risk assessment in 1999, but this risk assessment has not been published. The Maritime and Coastguard Agency convened with local and port authorities to discuss the report in 2001 and concluded that "doing nothing [was] not an option for much longer".

One of the reasons that the explosives have not been removed was the unfortunate outcome of a similar operation in July 1967, to neutralize the contents of the Polish cargo ship , that sank in 1946, off Folkestone in the English Channel. During preliminary work, Kielce exploded with a force equivalent to an earthquake measuring 4.5 on the Richter scale, digging a 20-foot-deep (6 m) crater in the seabed and bringing "panic and chaos" to Folkestone, although there were no injuries. Kielce was at least  from land, sunk in deeper water than Richard Montgomery, and had "just a fraction" of the load of explosives.

Almost every window in Sheerness (population circa 20,000) would be broken and buildings would be damaged by the blast.

When the condition of the munitions was originally assessed there was concern that copper azide, an extremely sensitive explosive, would be produced through reaction between lead azide and copper from fuse components (lead azide would react with water vapour, rather than liquid water, to form hydrazoic acid, which could react with copper in the detonating cap to form copper azide).

The Maritime and Coastguard Agency (MCA) said in 1998, "as the fuses will probably all have been flooded for many years and the sensitive compounds referred to are all soluble in water this is no longer considered to be a significant hazard".

Critics of government assurances that the likelihood of a major explosion is remote argue that one of the fuses of the 2,600 fused-fragmentation devices could become partially flooded and undergo the reaction producing copper azide. A knock, such as caused by the ship breaking up further, or a collision on the busy shipping lane, could cause the copper azide to explode and trigger an explosive chain reaction detonating the bulk of the munitions.

The wreck site has been surveyed regularly since 1965 to determine the stability of the structure, with a diver survey being completed in 2003. High-resolution multi-beam sonar surveys in 2005 and September 2006 found that there had been no recent significant movement of the wreck.

Surveys undertaken in 2008 and 2009 by the MCA, showed that the ship was continuing to deteriorate structurally, with accelerated deterioration in some areas and new cracks appearing in the bow section of the wreck. The report states that "Whilst significant structural collapse does not appear to be imminent, surveys suggest that this prospect is getting closer." The increasing calls for a new airport in the Thames estuary would mean a solution would have to be found for removing the wreck, or at least making it safe, should the airport be built.

The 2010 survey report, released in May 2012, found that, while there had been little change in 2009–2010, the future was uncertain due to the "dynamic nature" of the surrounding environment. Mayor of London Boris Johnson said that engineers had found the wreck would not prevent construction of an airport, and the wreck area would have to be considered. Julian Huppert, the co-chair of the Liberal Democrats committee on transport, disagreed, saying: "This report shows the ship's slow deterioration is continuing with the lethal cargo still on board", and "This must surely put an end to the bonkers idea of building an airport in the Thames estuary." A 2013 Daily Telegraph article quoting local historian Colin Harvey, agreed the ship would have to be removed before any airport was built and printed a spectrogram showing the ship clearly broken into two pieces. However, a DfT spokesperson said that the ship remained stable, and the likelihood of an explosion was remote; the matter of the ship was unrelated to the ongoing development of the aviation strategy.

In June 2020, the DfT announced it was looking for a contractor to remove the ship's three masts as they were placing undue strain on the rest of the vessel structure. The Ministry of Defence (MoD) warned that the collapse of a mast could detonate ordnance, and Royal Navy specialists would need to remove them safely. In December 2021 it was reported that a contractor supported by the Navy would remove the ship's masts, starting in June 2022. At the end of June 2022 it was reported that the work to remove the masts would be delayed another year.

In media

In the second series of the Sky programme COBRA, broadcast in 2021, the Montgomery (unnamed in the series) explodes as a consequence of undersea earthquakes, with the consequences predicted in the 1970 BBC report: heavy flooding, property damage and great loss of life (including the local MP) in Sheerness.

See also
 List of accidents and incidents involving transport or storage of ammunition

Notes

References

Bibliography

External links
 Maritime and Coastguard Agency website page, including links to survey reports. Updated periodically with new publications.
 River Thames Sites
 Men and ships of US Merchant marine (merchant navy)
 The Richard Montgomery matter. Up to date information and links about the dangers the wreck presents

Liberty ships
World War II shipwrecks in the North Sea
Protected Wrecks of England
Maritime incidents in August 1944
1944 in England
Ships built in Jacksonville, Florida
1943 ships
Shipwrecks of the River Thames
Thames Estuary